Le Monde doit m’arriver (2012) or Find the Way is a French feature film shot in Marseille in 2010 and finalized in 2012. 
This is the first feature film of Jonathan Taieb as director.

Synopsis
Ludo, an almost-30-year-old wistful artist, finds his life turned upside down after a potentially serious health problem, a break-up, and after meeting Raphael, a child doomed by an incurable disease.

Cast
Alex Skarbek
Jeremy Taieb
Sabrina Nouchi
Rozenn Djonkovitch
Gildas Saublet
Georges Martin-Censier

External links
Le Monde doit m'arriver at IMDB

French comedy-drama films
2012 films
2010s French films